Joseph Watt (1887–1955) was a Scottish recipient of the Victoria Cross.

Joseph or Joe Watt may also refer to:

 Joseph M. Watt (born 1947), Oklahoma Supreme Court Justice
 Joe Watt (1919–1983), NFL running back

See also
Joe Watts, mobster